Pagurus bernhardus is the common marine hermit crab of Europe's Atlantic coasts. It is sometimes referred to as the common hermit crab or soldier crab. P. bernhardus is an omnivorous detritivore that opportunistically scavenges for carrion, and which can also filter feed when necessary.

Pagurus bernhardus uses shells of a number of gastropod species for protection, including Littorina littorea, Littorina obtusata, Nassarius reticulatus, Gibbula umbilicalis, Nucella lapillus and Buccinum. In the warmer parts of its range, the sea anemone Calliactis parasitica is often found growing on the shell occupied by Pagurus bernhardus. In colder waters, this role is filled by Hormathia digitata. Hermit crabs fight one another for gastropod shells and have a preference for shells of certain species.

References

External links

Hermit crabs
Crustaceans of the Atlantic Ocean
Crustaceans described in 1758
Taxa named by Carl Linnaeus